Joseph Porteus (20 April 1925 – 9 January 1995) was an English professional footballer who played as a half-back in the Football League for York City, in non-League football for Goole Town and was on the books of Chesterfield without making a league appearance.

References

1925 births
People from Shildon
Footballers from County Durham
1995 deaths
English footballers
Association football midfielders
Chesterfield F.C. players
York City F.C. players
Goole Town F.C. players
English Football League players